The Guanajibo River is a river that runs through Hormigueros, Cabo Rojo, Mayagüez, San Germán, and Sabana Grande in Puerto Rico.

Flood control project
In mid 2018, the United States Army Corps of Engineers announced it would be undertaking a major flood control project of the river, with a $60 million budget.

See also
 Silva Bridge: NRHP listing in Cabo Rojo, Puerto Rico
 List of rivers of Puerto Rico

References

External links
 USGS Hydrologic Unit Map – Caribbean Region (1974)

Rivers of Puerto Rico
Mayagüez, Puerto Rico